Burleigh is an electoral division in the Legislative Assembly of Queensland in Australia.

The division of Burleigh is located on the southern Gold Coast, centred on Burleigh Heads. It includes the Gold Coast suburbs of Burleigh Heads, Burleigh Waters, Palm Beach and parts of Varsity Lakes and Tallebudgera.

Members for Burleigh

Election results

References

External links
 Electorate profile (Antony Green, ABC)

Burleigh